= Sebeda =

Harbour on the coast of ancient Lycia

Coordinates: 36°10′24″N 29°39′03″E

Sebeda (Ancient Greek: Σέβεδα) was a harbour on the coast of ancient Lycia.

Its site is located near Bayındır Liman, Asiatic Turkey.
